In quantum mechanics, the Landau–Yang theorem is a selection rule for particles that decay into two on-shell photons. The theorem states that a massive particle with spin 1 cannot decay into two photons.

Assumptions 

A photon here is any particle with spin 1, without mass and without internal degrees of freedom. The photon is the only known particle with these properties.

Consequences 

The theorem has several consequences in particle physics. For example:

 The meson ρ cannot decay into two photons, differently from the neutral pion, that almost always decays into this final state (98.8% of times).
 The boson Z cannot decay into two photons.
 The Higgs boson, whose spin was not measured before 2013, but whose decay into two photons was observed in 2012 cannot have spin 1 in models that assume the Landau-Yang theorem.

Original references

Additional references 

Theorems in quantum mechanics
Lev Landau